Togeworl (Hangul: , also known as Two Months) is a South Korean folk pop duo, who formed in New Jersey in 2011. They competed in the Superstar K3 singing competition, placing third. The duo went on temporary hiatus in 2013, and vocalist Lim Kim debuted as a solo musician.

Biography 

The duo consists of vocalist Lim Kim (Korean name: Kim Ye-rim; Hangul: 김예림) and Denny Do (Korean name: Do Dae-yoon; Hangul: 도대윤). Though both born in South Korea, the pair met in high school, when they both attended Leonia High School in Leonia, New Jersey, United States. Kim approached Do, who she did not know very well, after hearing he was a talented guitarist, to audition together for the New York City auditions of the South Korean singing competition Superstar K3. He agreed, and they auditioned together as Togeworl, meaning two months in Korean. They chose the name after only knowing each other for two months. They auditioned with the songs "Virtual Insanity" by Jamiroquai and "Romantico" by Tete.

Togeworl managed to pass the audition, and flew to Seoul to compete. The duo were successful, and were picked to be mentored by singer-songwriter Yoon Jong Shin. During the competition, the duo covered many artists, such as The Classic's "Fox," Lady Gaga's "Poker Face" and "Brown City" Browneyed Soul. "Fox" charted at number two on the Billboard Korea K-Pop Hot 100 and number three on the Gaon Singles Chart, selling more than 2,000,000 music downloads in 2011. Eventually Togeworl finished third in the competition, behind Ulala Session and Busker Busker.

After the competition, Kim and Do remained in South Korea, where they continued to receive musical training, and signed a contract with Mystic89, the label of mentor Yoon Jong Shin. Togeworl released their first song in February 2012 for the soundtrack for the TVN variety show The Romantic.

Togeworl planned to debut properly in 2013, however Do Dae-yoon had to return to the United States, due to issues with graduating high school. Because of this, it was decided that Lim Kim should debut as a solo artist before Togeworl reunited.

On May 24, 2013, Togeworl released a single called "Number 1," celebrating their two-year anniversary. In June, Lim Kim debuted as a solo musician, and her song "All Right" reached number two on Gaon's singles chart. She released a full-length album, Goodbye 20, in November 2013.

Discography

Singles

Other charted songs

References

External links
Togeworl at Mystic89

South Korean musical duos
Musical groups established in 2012
South Korean folk rock groups
South Korean pop music groups
Superstar K participants
2012 establishments in South Korea